The Red Anchor Stakes, is a Moonee Valley Racing Club Group 3 Australian Thoroughbred horse race for horses aged three years old, at set weights with penalties, over a distance of 1200 metres, held at Moonee Valley Racecourse, Melbourne, Australia on W. S. Cox Plate Day.  Prize money is A$200,000.

History
In 1995 the race was held at Caulfield Racecourse. Prior to 2005 the race was run in September when it was known as the C S Hayes Stakes, named after the champion trainer Colin S. Hayes (1924–1999).

The registered race is named after the champion Australian Horse of the Year in 1984–85, Red Anchor, who won the W. S. Cox Plate–Victoria Derby in that year.

Distance
1985 onwards - 1200 metres

Grade
1985–1989 - Listed Race
1990 onwards - Group 3

Name
 1985–1989 - Red Anchor Stakes
 1990–2004 - C S Hayes Stakes
 2005–2007 - City Pacific Finance Stakes
 2008 - Wonderful World Stakes
 2009 - Red Anchor Stakes
 2010–2011 - 1300 Australia Stakes
 2012–2019 - Telstra Phonewords Stakes
 2020 onwards - Red Anchor Stakes

Winners

 2022 - Sejardan
 2021 - Generation
 2020 - Portland Sky
 2019 - Sartorial Splendor
 2018 - Charge
 2017 - Eptimum
 2016 - Archives
 2015 - Holler
2014 - Galaxy Pegasus
 2013 - Thermal Current
 2012 - Hidden Warrior
 2011 - Karuta Queen
 2010 - That's Not It
 2009 - Avenue
 2008 - Millbank
 2007 - Royal Asscher
 2006 - Corton Charlemagne
 2005 - Coronga
 2004 - Oratorio
 2003 - Youth
 2002 - Yell
 2001 - Deprave
 2000 - Sound The Alarm
 1999 - Prizefighter
 1998 - Sedation
 1997 - Towkay
 1996 - Spartacus
 1995 - Captive
 1994 - Cannibal King
 1993 - Sequalo
 1992 - Snow Lord
 1991 - Hula Grey
 1990 - Begone
 1989 - Hot Arch
 1988 - Clay Hero
 1987 - Christmas Tree
 1986 - Rubiton
 1985 - Seiger

See also
 List of Australian Group races
 Group races

References

Horse races in Australia
Sports competitions in Melbourne